Joanna Hines is a British author of fiction and non-fiction. She has published a number of acclaimed novels, including Improvising Carla which was dramatised for UK television. She studied at Somerville College, Oxford. She was a Royal Literary Fund fellow at St Mary's University.

Her mother, Nancy Isobel Myers, was the first wife of writer Lawrence Durrell. She now publishes non-fiction under her maiden name, Joanna Hodgkin.

Works

Fiction
Dora's Room London : Coronet Books, 1993. , 
The Fifth Secret London : Hodder, 1995
Autumn of Strangers London : Hodder, 1997
Improvising Carla London : Simon & Schuster, 2000. ,  
Surface Tension London : Simon & Schuster, 2002. , 
Angels of the Flood London : Simon & Schuster, 2004. , 
The Murder Bird New York : Pocket Books, 2007. , 
The Cornish Girl London : Hodder, 1994 
The Puritan's Wife London : Hodder, 1996
The Lost Daughter London : Hodder, 1999

Non-fiction 
(as Joanna Hodgkin)
Amateurs in Eden London : Virago, 2012. , 
 Tell Me Who I Am London : Hodder 2013 co authored with Alex and Marcus Lewis.

Tell Me Who I Am was released as a documentary for Netflix in 2019.

References

External links 
 https://web.archive.org/web/20070123070841/http://joannahines.co.uk/

Year of birth missing (living people)
Living people
British writers
Alumni of Somerville College, Oxford